Rob Miller (born 28 March 1980) is an English footballer who played in The Football League for Cambridge United. His only appearance for Cambridge came in a 2–1 defeat away at Millwall during the 1999–2000 season.

References

External links
 

English footballers
Bedford Town F.C. players
Cambridge United F.C. players
Coventry City F.C. players
Stevenage F.C. players
English Football League players
1980 births
Living people
Association football defenders